Bambolê is a Brazilian telenovela produced and displayed at the time of 18 hours by TV Globo, September 7, 1987 to March 25, 1988, in 173 chapters. Substitute Direito de Amar and be succeeded by Fera Radical.

Written by Daniel Más, with collaboration of Ana Maria Moretzsohn, with general direction of Wolf Maya, Atílio Riccó and Ignácio Coqueiro, with direction of Production of Carlos Henrique de Cerqueira Leite and report of romance of Carolina Nabuco, Chama e Cinzas, was the 34th "novel of the six" shown by the station.

Cast 
 Cláudio Marzo - Álvaro Galhardo
 Susana Vieira - Marta Junqueira
 Joana Fomm - Fausta
 Myrian Rios - Ana Galhardo
 Paulo Castelli - Luiz Fernando
 Rubens de Falco - Nestor Barreto
 Sandra Bréa - Glória Müller / Condessa Von Trop
 Thaís de Campos - Yolanda Galhardo
 Carla Marins - Cristina Galhardo
 Maurício Mattar - Murilo Junqueira
 Guilherme Leme - Aligator
 Mila Moreira - Mumu Soares Sampaio
 Herval Rossano - Antenor
 Regina Restelli - Bete Nigri
 Antônio Calloni - Augusto
 Denise Fraga - Amália
 Rodolfo Bottino - Evaristo de Pádua
 Jacqueline Laurence - Charlotte du Pompé
 Riva Nimitz - Júlia
 Armando Bogus - Gabriel
 Jonas Mello - Delegado Livramento
 Norma Blum - Carmem
 Germano Filho - Manoel
 Carla Daniel - Mara
 Andréa Avancini - Ritinha
 Guido Brunini - Júlio
 Cláudia Lira - Orsina
 Eri Johnson - Canguru
 Jacyra Sampaio - Edite (Bá)
 Guilherme Corrêa - Antônio
 Frederico Mayrink - Felipe José
 Henrique César - Almirante Osório
 Ibanez Filho - Embaixador Flores
 Joyce de Oliveira - Miou
 Leina Krespi - Dona Maria
 Maria Lúcia Dahl - Hermínia
 Antônio Pedro - Abílio
 Tereza Teller - Zuleika
 Cláudio Corrêa e Castro - Zambrini
 Hugo Gross - João Mário
 Paulo Romani - Abílio

References

External links

1987 Brazilian television series debuts
1988 Brazilian television series endings
1987 telenovelas
TV Globo telenovelas
Brazilian telenovelas
Portuguese-language telenovelas
Television series set in 1958